George Oscar Paskvan (April 28, 1918 – April 25, 2005) was an American football fullback who played professional in the National Football League (NFL) for seven games for with Green Bay Packers in 1941.  The Packers used the seventh pick in the first round of the 1941 NFL Draft to sign Paskvan out of the University of Wisconsin–Madison.  Paskvan rushed 38 times for 116 yards in his NFL career. Besides football Paskvan also competed in the shot put.  

Paskvan was married to Georgine E. Paskvan, who died before him. They had six children: Sue Joyce, Fran Greene, Tom, Tim, Paul and Mary.

References

References
 

1918 births
2005 deaths
American football fullbacks
Iowa Pre-Flight Seahawks football players
Green Bay Packers players
Wisconsin Badgers football players
Sportspeople from Cook County, Illinois
Players of American football from Illinois